Lawrence Allen Gilbert, Sr. (November 19, 1942 – January 21, 1998) was an American professional golfer best known for winning the 1997 Senior Players Championship, one of the major championships on the Senior PGA Tour.

Gilbert was born in Fort Knox, Kentucky. He attended Middle Tennessee State University in Murfreesboro, Tennessee and was a distinguished member of the golf team. Gilbert led Middle Tennessee State to victory in the 1965 NCAA Division II Men's Golf Championships for which Gilbert won the individual medal.

Gilbert spent most of his regular career years as a club pro in Kentucky and Tennessee. He won the PGA Club Professional Championship in 1981, 1982 and 1991. He also won ten Kentucky PGA Championships, three Kentucky Opens, one Tennessee Open and one Tennessee PGA Championship. Gilbert was inducted into the Kentucky Golf Hall of Fame in 1992; he is also a member of  the Middle Tennessee State University Athletics Hall of Fame. He joined the Senior PGA Tour (later known as the Champions Tour) upon turning 50 in 1992.

Gilbert died in Lexington, Kentucky of lung cancer at the age of 55. He had started smoking cigarettes at an early age, and was often seen smoking a cigar while playing. He won the Senior Players Championship only 192 days before he died.

Professional wins (21)

Other wins (18)
1968 Kentucky Open
1970 Tennessee Open
1971 Tennessee PGA Championship
1974 Kentucky PGA Championship
1975 Kentucky Open
1976 Kentucky Open
1979 Kentucky PGA Championship
1980 Kentucky PGA Championship
1981 PGA Club Professional Championship, Kentucky PGA Championship
1982 PGA Club Professional Championship, Kentucky PGA Championship
1984 Kentucky PGA Championship, Kentucky PGA Match Play Championship
1985 Kentucky PGA Championship
1986 Kentucky PGA Match Play Championship
1990 Kentucky PGA Championship
1991 PGA Club Professional Championship

Senior PGA Tour wins (3)

Senior PGA Tour playoff record (0–1)

Champions Tour major championships

Wins (1)

U.S. national team appearances
PGA Cup: 1976 (winners), 1977 (tie), 1981 (tie), 1982 (winners), 1983, 1992 (winners)

References

External links

American male golfers
PGA Tour Champions golfers
Winners of senior major golf championships
Golfers from Kentucky
Middle Tennessee State University alumni
Deaths from lung cancer in Kentucky
1942 births
1998 deaths